Saccharosydne is a genus of delphacid planthoppers in the family Delphacidae. There are about nine described species in Saccharosydne.

Species
These nine species belong to the genus Saccharosydne:
 Saccharosydne brevirostris Muir, 1926
 Saccharosydne gracillis Muir, 1926
 Saccharosydne ornatipennis Muir, 1926
 Saccharosydne procerus Matsumura, 1924
 Saccharosydne rostrifrons (Crawford, 1914)
 Saccharosydne saccharivora (Westwood, 1833) (west Indian canefly)
 Saccharosydne subandina Remes Lenicov & Rossi Batiz, 2010
 Saccharosydne viridis Muir, 1926

References

Further reading

 
 
 
 

 Taxonomy, distribution and biology of the tribe Saccharosydnini (Insecta, Hemiptera, Fulguromorpha) (Spanish) Taxonomía, distribución y biología de la tribu Saccharosydnini (Insecta, Hemiptera, Fulguromorpha).

Articles created by Qbugbot
Auchenorrhyncha genera
Delphacini